In number theory, the Mertens function is defined for all positive integers n as

 

where  is the Möbius function. The function is named in honour of Franz Mertens. This definition can be extended to positive real numbers as follows:

 

Less formally,  is the count of square-free integers up to x that have an even number of prime factors, minus the count of those that have an odd number.

The first 143 M(n) values are 

The Mertens function slowly grows in positive and negative directions both on average and in peak value, oscillating in an apparently chaotic manner passing through zero when n has the values
2, 39, 40, 58, 65, 93, 101, 145, 149, 150, 159, 160, 163, 164, 166, 214, 231, 232, 235, 236, 238, 254, 329, 331, 332, 333, 353, 355, 356, 358, 362, 363, 364, 366, 393, 401, 403, 404, 405, 407, 408, 413, 414, 419, 420, 422, 423, 424, 425, 427, 428, ... .

Because the Möbius function only takes the values −1, 0, and +1, the Mertens function moves slowly, and there is no x such that |M(x)| > x. The Mertens conjecture went further, stating that there would be no x where the absolute value of the Mertens function exceeds the square root of x. The Mertens conjecture was proven false in 1985 by Andrew Odlyzko and Herman te Riele. However, the Riemann hypothesis is equivalent to a weaker conjecture on the growth of M(x), namely M(x) = O(x1/2 + ε). Here, O refers to big O notation.

The true rate of growth of M(x) is not known. An unpublished conjecture of Steve Gonek states that

 

Probabilistic evidence towards this conjecture is given by Nathan Ng. That is, for all bounded Lipschitz continuous functions  on the reals we have that

 

if one assumes various conjectures about the Riemann zeta function.

Representations

As an integral
Using the Euler product, one finds that

 

where  is the Riemann zeta function, and the product is taken over primes. Then, using this Dirichlet series with Perron's formula, one obtains

 

where c > 1.

Conversely, one has the Mellin transform

 

A curious relation given by Mertens himself involving the second Chebyshev function is

 

Assuming that the Riemann zeta function has no multiple non-trivial zeros, one has the "exact formula" by the residue theorem:

 

Weyl conjectured that the Mertens function satisfied the approximate functional-differential equation

 

where H(x) is the Heaviside step function, B are Bernoulli numbers, and all derivatives with respect to t are evaluated at t = 0.

There is also a trace formula involving a sum over the Möbius function and zeros of the Riemann zeta function in the form

 

where the first sum on the right-hand side is taken over the non-trivial zeros of the Riemann zeta function, and (g, h) are related by the Fourier transform, such that

As a sum over Farey sequences
Another formula for the Mertens function is

 

where  is the Farey sequence of order n.

This formula is used in the proof of the Franel–Landau theorem.

As a determinant
M(n) is the determinant of the n × n Redheffer matrix, a (0, 1) matrix in which
aij is 1 if either j is 1 or i divides j.

As a sum of the number of points under n-dimensional hyperboloids
 

This formulation expanding the Mertens function suggests asymptotic bounds obtained by considering the Piltz divisor problem, which generalizes the Dirichlet divisor problem of computing asymptotic estimates for the summatory function of the divisor function.

Calculation 
Neither of the methods mentioned previously leads to practical algorithms to calculate the Mertens function.
Using sieve methods similar to those used in prime counting, the Mertens function has been computed for all integers up to an increasing range of x.

The Mertens function for all integer values up to x may be computed in  time.

See  for values of M(x) at powers of 10.

Known upper bounds
Ng notes that the Riemann hypothesis (RH) is equivalent to

for some positive constant . Other upper bounds have been obtained by Maier, Montgomery, and Soundarajan assuming the RH including

Other explicit upper bounds are given by Kotnik as

See also
 Perron's formula
 Liouville's function

Notes

References 

Deléglise, M. and Rivat, J. "Computing the Summation of the Möbius Function." Experiment. Math. 5, 291-295, 1996. Computing the summation of the Möbius function

Nathan Ng, "The distribution of the summatory function of the Möbius function", Proc. London Math. Soc. (3) 89 (2004) 361-389. 

Arithmetic functions